Rocky Hill Country Day School is an independent, coeducational, college preparatory day school located on 84 acres along the Potowomut River and Narragansett Bay in Warwick, Rhode Island. It educates in grades nursery through grade 12.

History
The school was founded in 1934 by Dorothy Marshall as a local preschool. Three years later, the first official schoolhouse was constructed to serve preschool through third grade. Nathan Hale, a descendant of the Revolutionary war hero of the same name, purchased the school in 1941. and changed the school's name to Rocky Hill Country Day School Four years after, the school’s first ninth grade class graduated. In 1945, Rocky Hill Country Day School moved 245 students to the former Hopelands country estate, which was later acquired by the school and incorporated as a non-profit.

Uniforms and yearbooks were instilled as well as the development of the School’s Alma mater after Robert C. Smith became the headmaster in 1962. Five years later, the first 12th grade class graduated.

In 2001, the first laptop classroom was implemented and a student laptop program was later launched in 2004.

Educational model
This is a coeducational school that comprises three divisions
 Lower School: Serving nursery- grade 5
 Middle School: Serving grade 6 - grade 8
 Upper School: Serving grade 9- grade 12

The Rocky Hill Country Day School Model encourages all students to articulate and champion their own ideas to strive towards intellectual independence and a lifetime of learning. Through integrating technology in the classroom, outside learning and the implementation of the Harkness methodology (Grades 6-12) where students and teachers sit at a round table encouraging discussions and involvement.

Heads of School
 Dorothy Marshall
 Nathan Hale
 Robert C. Smith
 Hugh Campbell
 Alan F. Flynn, Jr.
 R. Leith Herrmann
 James J. Young III ‘70
 Jonathan M. Schoenwald Ph.D.
 Peter M. Branch
 Dr. James Tracy
 Diane Rich

Facilities
 Perkins Hall
 Gibson Hall
 Sharpe Gymnasium
 Carriage House
 Hale Science Center
 Alan F. Flynn, Jr. Academic Center
 Hopelands
 Brickhouse
 Academic Center for Enrichment
 Marshall House (Preschool)
 Pony Barn
 Campbell Center
 Pump House
 Head of School residence

Notable alumni
 Rudy Tanzi ’78
 Mena Suvari ’97
 Rome Kirby ’07
 Damian Rivera '21

References

External links
 

Private high schools in Rhode Island
Educational institutions established in 1934
Buildings and structures in East Greenwich, Rhode Island
Preparatory schools in Rhode Island
1934 establishments in Rhode Island
Schools in Kent County, Rhode Island